Paul Desjardins (born September 27, 1943 in Ottawa, Ontario) is a former all-star professional Canadian football offensive lineman who played nine seasons in the Canadian Football League.

External links
Career bio

1943 births
Living people
Canadian football offensive linemen
Franco-Ontarian people
Ottawa Gee-Gees football players
Players of Canadian football from Ontario
Canadian football people from Ottawa
Toronto Argonauts players
Winnipeg Blue Bombers players